Wild Horse River is a tributary of the Kootenay River in the East Kootenay region of southeastern British Columbia. The river flows southwest from the Canadian Rockies to the mouth, which lies immediately south of Fort Steele.

Name origin
On his 1814 map, David Thompson called the stream Luissier. In late 1863, a group led by Joe Findlay were gold panning at the river mouth. Observing either a black wild stallion or a cayuse on the hillside, which possibly showed interest in one of their mares, they called the stream Stud Horse Creek. A year or two later, the official rename was Wild Horse Creek. Around 1950, Wild Horse River became the common name.

Mining
In 1864, an important mining camp was established at Fisherville. Placer mining yielded close to $7,000,000 in gold during the goldrush. Worked by both European and Chinese miners, the river has been a significant BC gold producing stream. Mike Reynolds in the 1860s found a  gold nugget, which was the largest one recovered from the river. Mining methods have included hydraulics, tunnels, and shafts. The river experienced major mining activity from 1863 to 1868 and from 1885 to 1900.

Springs
Accessible by a hiking trail, the major sources at the upper level are warm and cold springs. On Crown land, the water is clear and odourless. Several former springs have dried up.

See also
List of British Columbia rivers
British Columbia Gold Rushes

Footnotes

References

Rivers of British Columbia
Canadian gold rushes
British Columbia gold rushes
East Kootenay
Canyons and gorges of British Columbia
Tributaries of the Kootenay River